Robert James Clasby (born September 28, 1960) is a former American football defensive lineman who played five seasons in the National Football League (NFL). He was drafted in the ninth round (236th overall) by the Seattle Seahawks after playing college football for Notre Dame. He played for five seasons in the NFL for the St. Louis/Phoenix Cardinals.

References 

1960 births
Living people
Players of American football from Detroit
American football defensive tackles
American football defensive ends
Notre Dame Fighting Irish football players
Chicago Blitz players
Jacksonville Bulls players
St. Louis Cardinals (football) players
Arizona Cardinals players